Eldridge is a census-designated place (CDP) in Sonoma County, California, United States. The population was 1,233 at the 2010 census.  It is notably the home to the Sonoma Developmental Center, the largest facility serving the needs of persons with developmental disabilities in the state.

History
Eldridge is named for James Eldridge who owned part of the Rancho Cabeza de Santa Rosa land grant.

Geography

Demographics

2010
The 2010 United States Census reported that Eldridge had a population of 1,233. The racial makeup of Eldridge was 988 (80.1%) White, 10 (0.8%) African American, 3 (0.2%) Native American, 36 (2.9%) Asian, 6 (0.5%) Pacific Islander, 144 (11.7%) from other races, and 46 (3.7%) from two or more races. Hispanic or Latino of any race were 325 persons (26.4%).

The Census reported that 99.8% of the population lived in households and 0.2% lived in non-institutionalized group quarters.

There were 500 households, out of which 155 (31.0%) had children under the age of 18 living in them, 242 (48.4%) were opposite-sex married couples living together, 46 (9.2%) had a female householder with no husband present, 28 (5.6%) had a male householder with no wife present.  There were 35 (7.0%) unmarried opposite-sex partnerships, and 5 (1.0%) same-sex married couples or partnerships. 137 households (27.4%) were made up of individuals, and 33 (6.6%) had someone living alone who was 65 years of age or older. The average household size was 2.46.  There were 316 families (63.2% of all households); the average family size was 3.02.

The population was spread out, with 274 people (22.2%) under the age of 18, 109 people (8.8%) aged 18 to 24, 320 people (26.0%) aged 25 to 44, 394 people (32.0%) aged 45 to 64, and 136 people (11.0%) who were 65 years of age or older.  The median age was 39.8 years. For every 100 females, there were 100.8 males.  For every 100 females age 18 and over, there were 99.0 males.

The homeowner vacancy rate was 2.2%; the rental vacancy rate was 12.4%. 54.5% of the population lived in owner-occupied housing units and 45.3% lived in rental housing units.

2000
As of the census of 2000, there were 1,534 people, 521 households, and 321 families residing in the CDP. The racial makeup of the CDP was 85.92% White, 1.96% African American, 0.78% Native American, 2.80% Asian, 0.20% Pacific Islander, 4.04% from other races, and 4.30% from two or more races. Hispanic or Latino of any race were 13.95% of the population.

There were 521 households, out of which 35.9% had children under the age of 18 living with them, 46.3% were married couples living together, 10.4% had a female householder with no husband present, and 38.2% were non-families. 30.3% of all households were made up of individuals, and 5.8% had someone living alone who was 65 years of age or older.  The average household size was 2.44 and the average family size was 3.10.

In the CDP, the population was spread out, with 22.7% under the age of 18, 6.3% from 18 to 24, 35.5% from 25 to 44, 29.1% from 45 to 64, and 6.3% who were 65 years of age or older.  The median age was 38 years. For every 100 females, there were 99.7 males.  For every 100 females age 18 and over, there were 94.4 males.

The median income for a household in the CDP was $52,656, and the median income for a family was $62,500. Males had a median income of $35,426 versus $34,886 for females. The per capita income for the CDP was $24,076.  None of the families and 16.3% of the population were living below the poverty line, including no under eighteens and 11.8% of those over 64.

Government

See also
Arnold Drive Bridge

External links

Census-designated places in Sonoma County, California
Census-designated places in California